Pogoń Szczecin is a women's football team from Szczecin, Poland, the women's section of Pogoń Szczecin. It competes in the Ekstraliga, the country's top division (as of 2022–23).

History
The team was founded as TKKF Gryf Szczecin.

The team reached the Ekstraliga for the first time in 2010. In its debut season in the top division Gryf finished 4th, and it subsequently became Pogoń's women team. It has been successful in the national cup, reaching the final for three seasons in a row between 2009 and 2011. In them Gryf lost once to AZS Wrocław and twice to Unia Racibórz.

The team was dissolved after the 2012–13 Ekstraliga season. In 2022, the women's football section of Pogoń Szczecin was reactivated by merging the former women's club Olimpia Szczecin with Pogoń Szczecin.

Historical squads

2022–23 squad

Club statistics

Notes

References

External links 
Club's profile at the 90minut.pl

Women's football clubs in Poland
Sport in Szczecin
Association football clubs established in 2002
Women
2002 establishments in Poland